Luke's Speedy Club Life is a 1916 American short comedy film starring Harold Lloyd.

Cast
 Harold Lloyd as Lonesome Luke
 Snub Pollard as Bellhop
 Bebe Daniels as The Girl
 Charles Stevenson (as Charles E. Stevenson)
 Billy Fay
 Fred C. Newmeyer
 Sammy Brooks
 Harry Todd
 Bud Jamison
 Margaret Joslin (as Mrs. Harry Todd)
 Dee Lampton
 May Cloy
 Aileen Allen

See also
 Harold Lloyd filmography

References

External links

1916 films
1916 short films
American silent short films
American black-and-white films
Lonesome Luke films
Films directed by Hal Roach
1916 comedy films
Silent American comedy films
American comedy short films
1910s American films